Flight to Fury is a 1964 film starring Jack Nicholson, Fay Spain and Dewey Martin. The film was directed by Monte Hellman and filmed back to back with Back Door to Hell in the Philippines in 1964.

Nicholson was one of the writers of the screenplay. The film is about a battle over stolen jewels after a plane crash in the Philippines. A version in Filipino titled Cordillera, directed by Eddie Romero, was also released.

Plot
An American man identifying himself as a tourist, Jay Wickham, introduces himself to Joe Gaines in an Asian casino. After accompanying Lei Ling to her room, Wickham begins searching for a cache of diamonds believed to be in her possession, but is unable to find them.

On the only available plane leaving for the Philippines, the passengers include Gaines, Wickham and Ling, along with a man named Ross who is Ling's associate and carrying the diamonds, Lorgren (the rightful owner of the gems) and the latter's mistress, Destiny Cooper. A crash landing results in the death of some and serious injury to Ross, who hands Joe the gems before he dies.

Natives begin approaching the plane, ready to kill any survivors and take their possessions. Wickham finds the jewels, kills Lorgren, shoots Destiny and flees, but is wounded by Joe. Before he dies, Wickham tosses the diamonds into a river, as Joe awaits the dangerous natives and his fate.

Cast
 Dewey Martin as Joe Gaines
 Jack Nicholson as Jay Wickham
 Fay Spain as Destiny Cooper 
 Vic Díaz as Lorgren 
 Joseph Estrada as Garuda 
 John Hackett as Al Ross 
 Jacqueline Hellman as Gloria Walsh 
 Lucien Pan as Police Inspector 
 Juliet Prado as Lei Ling 
 Jennings Sturgeon as Bearded Man

Production
The film was based on an outline by Hellman and Fred Roos. Jack Nicholson adapted it into a script over a three-week period on a boat from the US to the Philippines. They did it as a homage to Beat the Devil and the film was originally entitled The Devils Game.
 
Hellman directed the film while editing Back Door to Hell at the same time. He fell ill in between directing the two films.

Lino Brocka worked as Hellman's assistant.

Reception
Lippert was unhappy with the comedic tone of the film and had it re-edited for its theatrical release losing 11 minutes. Hellman was able to re-insert the footage for the video release.

Cordillera
Eddie Romero directed a Filipino language version of the film titled Cordillera for release in the Philippines. According to Romero, he added some scenes and slightly changed the story.

See also
List of American films of 1964

References

External links
 
 
 
Flight to Fury at the BFI
 

1964 films
1960s adventure drama films
American adventure drama films
American black-and-white films
Philippine black-and-white films
Films about aviation accidents or incidents
Films about murder
Films about murderers
Films directed by Monte Hellman
Films set in the Philippines
Films with screenplays by Jack Nicholson
Treasure hunt films
Films shot in the Philippines
1964 drama films
1960s English-language films
1960s American films